

England

Head Coach: Geoff Cooke

 Rob Andrew
 Stuart Barnes
 Steve Bates
 Martin Bayfield
 Will Carling (c.)
 Ben Clarke
 Phil de Glanville
 Wade Dooley
 Jeremy Guscott
 Ian Hunter
 Martin Johnson
 Jason Leonard
 Brian Moore
 Dewi Morris
 John Olver
 Jeff Probyn
 Dean Richards
 Tim Rodber
 Mike Teague
 Victor Ubogu
 Rory Underwood
 Tony Underwood
 Jonathan Webb
 Peter Winterbottom

France

Head Coach: Pierre Berbizier

 Louis Armary
 Abdelatif Benazzi
 Philippe Benetton
 Laurent Cabannes
 Didier Camberabero
 Jérôme Cazalbou
 Marc Cecillon
 Stéphane Graou
 Pierre Hontas
 Aubin Hueber
 Thierry Lacroix
 Jean-Baptiste Lafond
 Fabrice Landreau
 Eric Melville
 Franck Mesnel
 Stéphane Ougier
 Olivier Roumat
 Philippe Saint-André
 Laurent Seigne
 Philippe Sella
 Jean-François Tordo (c.)

Ireland

Head Coach: Ciaran Fitzgerald

 Michael Bradley (c.)
 Ciaran Clarke
 Peter Clohessy
 Richard Costello
 Vince Cunningham
 Phil Danaher
 Eric Elwood
 Maurice Field
 Neil Francis
 Mick Galwey
 Simon Geoghegan
 Brian Glennon
 Garret Halpin
 Paddy Johns
 Terry Kingston
 Phil Lawlor
 Alan McGowan
 Niall Malone
 Denis McBride
 Paul McCarthy
 Ken O'Connell
 Patrick O'Hara
 Conor O'Shea
 Nick Popplewell
 Brian Robinson
 Rob Saunders
 Steve Smith
 Richard Wallace
 Colin Wilkinson
 Keith Wood

Scotland

Head Coach: Jim Telfer

 Gary Armstrong
 Paul Burnell
 Craig Chalmers
 Ian Corcoran
 Damian Cronin
 Gavin Hastings (c.)
 Scott Hastings
 Carl Hogg
 Ian Jardine
 Kenny Logan
 Kenny Milne
 Iain Morrison
 Andy Nicol
 Andy Reed
 Stuart Reid
 Graham Shiel
 Tony Stanger
 Derek Stark
 Gregor Townsend
 Derek Turnbull
 Alan Watt
 Doddie Weir
 Peter Wright

Wales

Head Coach: Alan Davies

 Paul Arnold
 Tony Clement
 Tony Copsey
 John D. Davies
 Nigel Davies
 Phil Davies
 Stuart Davies
 Ieuan Evans (c.)
 Ricky Evans
 Scott Gibbs
 Michael Hall
 Neil Jenkins
 Robert Jones
 Andrew Lamerton
 Emyr Lewis
 Gareth Llewellyn
 Nigel Meek
 Rupert Moon
 Mark Perego
 Wayne Proctor
 Mike Rayer
 Alan Reynolds
 Nigel Walker
 Richard Webster
 Huw Williams-Jones

External links

Six Nations Championship squads